Bukhara District is a district of Bukhara Region in Uzbekistan. The capital lies at the city Galaosiyo.

The district consists of 1 city (Galaosiyo), 6 urban-type settlements (Dexcha, Podshoyi, Rabotak, Oʻrta Novmetan, Xumini bolo, Arabxona) and 14 rural communities.

References

Bukhara Region
Districts of Uzbekistan